Mucuna gigantea is a species of large woody climber from the family Fabaceae. It is found in sub-Saharan Africa, India, tropical southern Asia, the Philippines, New Guinea and parts of Australia, and is commonly known as sea bean or burny bean.

Description
The inflorescence grows from the leaf axil, and is a pendulous, umbel-like bunch with the individual flowers on short lateral stalks. Each flower has a cup-shaped calyx with two lips, clad in fine greyish hairs. The seeds are disc-like and dark brown or black.

Distribution and habitat
Mucuna gigantea occurs in tropical Africa, southwestern and southern Asia, various Pacific islands and parts of Australia. In Africa its range extends from the Republic of Congo to Kenya, Tanzania and Madagascar. In Asia, its range includes India, Myanmar, Malaysia, Thailand and the Philippines, and it occurs in various islands in the Indian and Pacific Oceans. It occurs in New Guinea, and in Australia, in Western Australia, the Northern Territory and New South Wales. It mainly occurs in coastal scrubland, and when it occurs inland, as it does particularly in Africa, it is generally found near water, on riverbanks and lake shores, in scrub, at the edges of forests and in woodland.

Ecology

Germination in this species is hypogeal, the cotyledons remaining below the soil surface. The first true leaves are scale-like, and growth is very rapid, a height of a metre or more occurring in three weeks. The tissues are easily damaged, even the flowers turning black when injured. The flowers are a favourite with hummingbirds, and the seeds can be dispersed for long distances by sea currents, giving it a near pan-tropical distribution.

Nutrition
Analysis of the seeds shows 30.6% crude proteins, 9% crude lipids, 6% ash and 42.8% nitrogen free extract. The beans contain a relatively high proportion of the essential amino acids, leucine and isoleucine, and the minerals potassium, calcium, magnesium and iron are also abundant. Also present is the amino acid levodopa, which is used in the treatment of Parkinson's disease, but the beans also contain toxins, which can only be destroyed by lengthy soaking and boiling.

Uses
After suitable preparation, the seeds are eaten in Kenya and India. Aboriginal Australians bake them on hot stones, and having removed the skin, grind them into flour, mix this with water, wrap the dough in leaves and further bake it. An extract of the root has been used against schistosomiasis and gonorrhea, and the powdered seeds have been used as a laxative. The intensely irritating hairs from the pods have been used as poison in Malaysia, and have been mixed with food for control of rats.

References

gigantea